Kennedy Road is an intermediate station on the Peak Tram. It is located on Kennedy Road, in Central, Hong Kong, 56 metres above sea level.

The station comprises a single platform on the western side of the single track. The platform is longer than the trams currently used on the line, with a disused section of platform at the downhill end blocked to public access. Kennedy Road passes underneath the tramway at the south end of the station, the tramway crossing the road on a steel truss bridge.

The station is a request stop at which tram cars will stop only if passengers have pressed the request button inside the tramcar or at the station. No ticketing equipment is provided on the platform.

History
The nearby Union Church funded half the costs of building the Kennedy Road stop.

References

External links
 

Peak Tram stations